Motu Matu'u (born 30 April 1987) is a rugby union footballer who plays as a hooker for London Irish in Premiership Rugby. He previously played for Wellington Lions in the ITM Cup and for the Hurricanes in the Super Rugby. He attended Rongotai College in Wellington, which was also attended by Ma'a Nonu.
He is 184 cm tall and weighs 108 kg.

Matu'u is internationally capped by Samoa, of which his debut came of the bench against the United States during the 2015 World Rugby Pacific Nations Cup. He represented Samoa in the 2015 Rugby World Cup, and on 23 August 2019, he was named in Samoa's 34-man training squad for the 2019 Rugby World Cup, before being named in the final 31 on 31 August.

On 17 March 2016, Matu'u signed for English club Gloucester Rugby in the Aviva Premiership on a long-term deal from the 2016–17 season. On 24 May 2018, Matu'u left Gloucester to join London Irish from their return in the RFU Championship.

References

External links
Hurricanes Profile
Wellington Profile
itsrugby.co.uk Profile
Yahoo Profile

1987 births
Living people
New Zealand rugby union players
Hurricanes (rugby union) players
Wellington rugby union players
Rugby union hookers
People educated at Rongotai College
Rugby union players from Wellington City
Gloucester Rugby players
Expatriate rugby union players in England
Samoa international rugby union players
New Zealand expatriate sportspeople in England